The 2022–23 Premier League match between Liverpool and Bournemouth at Anfield, Liverpool, took place on Saturday 27 August 2022. Liverpool won 9–0, which is the joint-largest win in the history of the competition. Previously, the feat had only been achieved on three occasions in the Premier League; twice by Manchester United in 1995 and 2021 against Ipswich Town and Southampton respectively, and once by Leicester City in 2019, also against Southampton.

This match equalled Liverpool's biggest win in the top flight. They achieved the same scoreline at Anfield during the 1989–90 season against Crystal Palace. This was also Bournemouth's worst ever top-flight defeat. Bournemouth manager Scott Parker was sacked three days after the match.

Background 
Going into Gameweek 4 of the 2022–23 Premier League season, Liverpool, who were runners-up in the previous season, were enduring their worst start to a Premier League under manager Jürgen Klopp. They drew with newly-promoted Fulham and Crystal Palace, before losing in the North West Derby away to Manchester United. Meanwhile, despite beating Aston Villa at home on the opening day, Bournemouth, who were promoted from the EFL Championship in the previous season, were experiencing a similarly disappointing start to the season with one win and two defeats.

Pre-match

Team selection 
Liverpool made one change to the starting line-up that lost their previous match away at Manchester United; Brazilian holding-midfielder Fabinho was preferred to veteran James Milner. Centre-back Virgil van Dijk and midfielder Jordan Henderson made their 200th and 400th Premier League appearances respectively.

Bournemouth made three changes to the team who lost 3–0 at home to then league leaders Arsenal with Lewis Cook, Ryan Christie and Jaidon Anthony all coming into the starting XI.

Tributes to Olivia Pratt-Korbel 
In the 9th minute of the match, with Liverpool leading 2–0, a minute's applause commenced, to pay tribute to nine-year-old Olivia Pratt-Korbel: a girl from Liverpool who was killed by a trespasser in her own home. This was the first fixture played by Liverpool since the shooting. Two days prior to the match in a press conference, manager Klopp had described the killing as "such a tragedy" before saying "If we can help, we will". On the day of the match, Klopp wrote in his programme notes: “Nine years old? How can this happen? How is it even possible? I cannot comprehend it and the more I think about it, the more difficult it becomes to understand. That it could happen in a city as special as this one where people look out for one another and stand together makes even less sense. I would like to pass on the sympathies of everyone at Liverpool to Olivia’s family. They are in my thoughts and prayers.”

After the match, Liverpool captain Jordan Henderson removed his shirt with a vest underneath bearing the slogan: “RIP Olivia YNWA". He then tweeted "That was for Olivia" later that evening.

Match

Summary 
Liverpool raced into a 2–0 lead within the first six minutes through a Luis Díaz header and long-range effort from Harvey Elliott, the latter getting his first Premier League goal. Further strikes from Trent Alexander-Arnold and Roberto Firmino made it 4–0, before Virgil van Dijk headed in from a corner just before half-time.

Bournemouth defender Chris Mepham scored an own goal within a minute of the second half starting, before Firmino poked in the seventh, in the process reaching 100 goals for the club. Fábio Carvalho volleyed in his first goal for Liverpool before Díaz headed in the ninth with five minutes left.

Details

Statistics

Aftermath

After the match, Bournemouth manager Scott Parker said he was "not surprised" by the result,  stating the team was "ill-equipped". He was subsequently sacked by the club on 30 August, with owner Maxim Demin citing the need for "unconditional... [alignment] in our strategy to run the club sustainably", which was interpreted as a reaction to Parker's comments. Parker was replaced as manager by Gary O'Neil on the same day; first on an interim basis, then permanently on 27 November.

The two teams played again in the reverse fixture on 11 March 2023 at the Vitality Stadium, as Bournemouth defeated Liverpool 1–0 after a sole first-half goal by Philip Billing and a missed second-half penalty from Liverpool's Mohamed Salah. The score was seen as a shock, given the earlier result and the teams' respective forms — Liverpool were unbeaten in five after a historic 7–0 thrashing of in-form rivals Manchester United, while Bournemouth began the day at the bottom of the Premier League table.

Notes

References 

2022–23 Premier League
Premier League matches
Liverpool F.C. matches
AFC Bournemouth matches
Record association football wins
August 2022 sports events in the United Kingdom
2020s in Liverpool